Aşağı Filfili (also, Ashagy Fil’fili and Ashagy Fil’filli) is a village in the Oghuz Rayon of Azerbaijan.

References 

Populated places in Oghuz District